The 1989 Oregon State Beavers football team represented Oregon State University in the Pacific-10 Conference (Pac-10) during the 1989 NCAA Division I-A football season.  In their fifth season under head coach Dave Kragthorpe, the Beavers compiled a 4–7–1 record (3–4–1 against Pac-10 opponents), finished in sixth place in the Pac-10, and were outscored by their opponents, 357 to 207.  The team played its home games at Parker Stadium in Corvallis, Oregon.

Schedule

Personnel

Season summary

at Oregon

Largest crowd to attend football game in state history

References

Oregon State
Oregon State Beavers football seasons
Oregon State Beavers football